Pravakara Maharana is a sculptor from Odisha, India. In 2018, he received the Padma Sri honour by the President of India for his contributions towards the preservation of traditional sculpture art of Odisha.

References 

Indian male sculptors
Artists from Odisha
Recipients of the Padma Shri in arts